Persoonia acerosa, commonly known as needle geebung, is a species of flowering plant in the family Proteaceae and is endemic to a restricted area of New South Wales. It is a shrub with small, channelled, needle-like leaves, yellow tubular flowers and yellowish-green, pear-shaped fruit.

Description

Taxonomy
Persoonia acerosa was first formally described in 1827 by Josef August and Julius Hermann Schultes in their book Mantissa in volumen primum [-tertium] :Systematis vegetabilium caroli a Linné from an unpublished description by Franz Sieber.

Distribution and habitat
It is mainly found in the upper Blue Mountains and is believed to be extinct at Hill Top.

Conservation status
This geebung is listed as "vulnerable" under the Australian Government Environment Protection and Biodiversity Conservation Act 1999 and the New South Wales Government Biodiversity Conservation Act 2016. The main threats to the species are land clearing, burning for hazard reduction, weed invasion and disturbance by vehicles and rubbish dumping.

References

Flora of New South Wales
acerosa
Plants described in 1827
Taxa named by Josef August Schultes
Taxa named by Julius Hermann Schultes